Turun Toverit (TuTo) is a sports club based in Turku, Finland. It was established in 1929. Today it is best known of its ice hockey section TuTo Hockey. Other sections include sports like football, basketball, volleyball, wrestling and athletics. TuTo is a member of Finnish Workers' Sports Federation.

Most famous TuTo-athlete of all-time is Voitto Hellstén, the 400 metres bronze medalist at the 1956 Summer Olympics.

Ice hockey 

TuTo Hockey plays currently in the Finnish second level Mestis.

Football 
Football section of TuTo has played five seasons in the Finnish top division Mestaruussarja. Their best achievement is second place in 1947. Season 2020 TuTo plays in the seventh tier Kutonen.

Season to season

  
6 seasons in Veikkausliiga
24 seasons in Ykkönen
15 seasons in Kakkonen
12 seasons in Kolmonen
4 seasons in Nelonen
2 seasons in Vitonen
5 season in Kutonen

References

External links 
TuTo Official Home Page (in Finnish)

Sports clubs in Finland
Football clubs in Finland
Sport in Turku